Søren Krogh (born April 19, 1977) is a Danish football coach and former professional football midfielder. He is currently the assistant manager of OB.

Career

Coaching career
In July 2009 it was confirmed, that Krogh had joined Danish club BGA as a playing-assistant coach under manager Thomas Maale. In the summer 2011, Krogh joined his former club FC Nordsjælland as assistant coach for the U-19 team. He was promoted then promoted to the first team in July 2015, where he also would function as assistant coach. Two years later, in July 2017, he signed a contract extension with Nordsjælland. On 10 December 2019 Nordsjælland confirmed, that Krough would leave the club to join AaB.

AaB confirmed the arrival of Krogh as the club's new head of football on 10 December 2019, from the beginning of 2020. In November 2020 Krogh revealed, that he would leave his position at the end of the season, as he wanted to return coaching. However, he left the club already on 18 January 2022, when he was announced as the new assistant coach of Andreas Alm at Danish Superliga club OB.

References

External links
Danish national team profile
Career statistics
 Boldklubben Frem profile

1977 births
Living people
Danish men's footballers
Denmark under-21 international footballers
Brøndby IF players
Boldklubben Frem players
FC Nordsjælland players
Association football midfielders